The North European Men's Volleyball Club Championship (English. Nordic Club Championships, szw. Nordiska klubbmästerskapen) is a volleyball championship for clubs from the Nordic countries. It was established in 2007 and is organised by the North European Volleyball Zonal Association (NEVZA). Clubs from 8 NEVZA members competing every year in this competition, Teams from other neighbouring countries may be invited such as Estonia, Lithuania, Latvia.

Winners list

Winners by club

Winners by nations

References

External links 
Official website:
 NEVZA Volleyball Association 

NEVZA Men
Recurring sporting events established in 2008
2008 establishments in Europe
Multi-national professional sports leagues